Knott or The Knott may refer to:

 Knott, Caldbeck, a mountain in the northern part of the English Lake District
 The Knott, a mountain in the eastern part of the English Lake District
 Knott, Skye, a location in Highland, Scotland
 Knott, Texas, community in the state of Texas, United States
 Knott County, Kentucky, county in the state of Kentucky, United States
 Knott Hall, residence hall at the University of Notre Dame
 Knott Arena, sports arena at Mount Saint Mary's University, in Emmitsburg, Maryland, United States
 The Knott (Stickle Pike), summit near Stickle Pike, south-western Lake District, England
 The Knott (Stainton Pike), summit near Stainton Pike, south-western Lake District, England

For people with surname Knott, see:
 Knott (surname)

See also:
 Knott End-on-Sea, Lancashire, England
 Knotts
 Knott's (disambiguation)
 Knot (disambiguation)